The East Coast Conference men's basketball tournament is the annual conference basketball championship tournament for the East Coast Conference. The tournament has been held annually since 1990. It is a single-elimination tournament and seeding is based on regular season records.

The winner, declared conference champion, receives the EEC's automatic bid to the NCAA Men's Division II Basketball Championship.

Results

Championship records

UDC, Mercy, and Roberts Wesleyan have not yet qualified for the ECC tournament finals.
Concordia (NY), New Haven, NJIT, Pace, Southampton College never qualified for the ECC tournament finals as conference members.
 D'Youville and Staten Island began ECC play in 2020–21. The 2022–23 season is the first in which Staten Island is eligible for NCAA-sponsored postseason play, having completed its transition from NCAA Division III. D'Youville will not complete its transition until July 2023.
 Schools highlighted in pink are former members of the East Coast Conference.
 Schools highlighted in yellow are members of the East Coast Conference with suspended athletics programs.

See also
 East Coast Conference women's basketball tournament

References

NCAA Division II men's basketball conference tournaments
Tournament
Recurring sporting events established in 1990